William Patrick may refer to:
 William Patrick (author), American author
 William Patrick (minister) (1791–1872), minister of the Church of Scotland
 William Patrick Sr. (1845–1936), Australian politician
 William Patrick Jr. (1880–1968), Australian politician
 William C. Patrick III (1926–2010), American biologist
 William Penn Patrick (1930–1973), American entrepreneur and businessman
 William S. Patrick (19th century), American politician, mayor of Flint, Michigan
 William Patrick (diver) (1931–2016), Canadian diver
 William Patrick (Canadian politician) (1810–1883), clergyman, merchant and political figure in Canada West

See also
 Patrick (surname)
 Bill Patrick (disambiguation)
 Patrick Williams (disambiguation)